"Zaosie" is also the Polish name of Zavosse, Belarus, the birthplace of Adam Mickiewicz.

Zaosie  is a village in the administrative district of Gmina Ujazd, within Tomaszów Mazowiecki County, Łódź Voivodeship, in central Poland.

References

Zaosie